Romanche Glacier is a glacier located in Alberto de Agostini National Park, Chile. A cascade from the glacier tumbles into the Beagle Channel.

References

Glaciers of Magallanes Region